Walter Quincy Scott (December 19, 1845 – May 9, 1917) was an American educator who was the second President of Ohio State University and the fifth principal of Phillips Exeter Academy.

Scott was born in Dayton, Ohio on December 19, 1845, to Abram McLean Scott and Julia Ann Scott. At a young age, he moved to Iowa. He attended Fairfield University, his studies punctuated with the start of the American Civil War. After serving in the  Civil War, Scott attended Lafayette College in Easton, Pennsylvania and the Columbia University-affiliated Union Theological Seminary. Immediately after graduating, he began teaching ancient languages at Lafayette. An ordained Presbyterian minister, Scott led Arch Street Presbyterian Church in Philadelphia, Pennsylvania from 1874 to 1878.  Scott's taught at Wooster College in 1878, where he was professor of mental and moral philosophy and political economy. In 1881, he became president of Ohio State University. Though he was popular with students, he was immensely disliked by politicians, and resigned shortly thereafter in 1883 due to frequent interference in his work from politicians. He then became principal of Phillips Exeter Academy, where he started in 1884. He resigned in 1889 to go to Chicago, Illinois, and be involved in the publishing business. Disliking the city, he soon became the pastor of a Presbyterian church in Albany, New York. He resigned after a three years. In 1909, he was named President Emeritus of the Ohio State University Board of Trustees, later on for ten years becoming at the Bible Teachers' Training School of New York City the professor of church history and ethnic religions.

Walter Scott died on May 9, 1917, in Ellensburg, Washington. He was married to Cornelia (Edgar) Scott, with whom he had three children: Walter Quincy Scott Jr., Edith Davis, and Cornelia Bull.

References

External links 
 Past Presidents of the Ohio State University

Presidents of Ohio State University
1845 births
1917 deaths
People from Dayton, Ohio
Phillips Exeter Academy faculty
Fairfield University alumni
Lafayette College alumni
Union Theological Seminary (New York City) alumni
19th-century Presbyterian ministers
20th-century Presbyterian ministers
American Presbyterian ministers
20th-century American clergy
19th-century American clergy